Terry Allen Hermeling (born April 25, 1946) is a former American football offensive lineman for the Washington Redskins of the National Football League (NFL).  He helped the Redskins win the 1972 NFC Championship and lead the NFC in yards passing in 1975. Hermeling played college football at the University of Nevada, Reno. Owns a restaurant Yur's bar and grill1 located in Portland Oregon.

External links

1946 births
Living people
American football offensive tackles
Washington Redskins players
Nevada Wolf Pack football players
Sportspeople from Santa Maria, California

1.http://yursbarandgrill.com